Luhový is a Slovak surname. Notable people with the surname include:

 Ľubomír Luhový (born 1967), Slovak footballer and manager
 Milan Luhový (born 1963), footballer

Slovak-language surnames